McGee Creek State Park is a state park in southern Oklahoma. The park is on the south side of McGee Creek Reservoir. Created in 1985 the reservoir provides flood control. Its main staple is recreational and sport fishing. The main fish fished for in this park include Crappie, Sunfish, Largemouth bass, and Channel catfish. The McGee Creek Wildlife Management area is located between the two arms of the reservoir.

Bear and deer are among the animals present. Shortleaf pine, though near its western limit, is abundant.

McGee Creek Natural Scenic Recreation Area is connected to with McGee Creek State Park. Both are a part of the McGee Creek Wildlife Management Area. The Natural Scenic Recreation Area is located in the top northeast area of the wildlife refuge. Activities in the Scenic Recreation Area include horseback riding, hiking, mountain biking, camping, fishing, canoeing, kayaking, and bouldering.

Proposed park closure in 2018

In March 2017, the Oklahoma Department of Tourism and Recreation published a list of 16 state parks that may be closed to help offset a reduction in its budget for 2018. McGee Creek State Park is on this list. This list represents approximately one-half of the parks remaining after the department closed seven parks in 2011.

References

Protected areas of Atoka County, Oklahoma
State parks of Oklahoma